The 1966 Texas gubernatorial election was held on November 8, 1966, to elect the governor of Texas. Incumbent Democratic Governor John Connally was easily reelected to a third term, winning 73% of the vote to Republican T. E. Kennerly's 26%. Connally swept all 254 counties in this election and was inaugurated for his third term on January 17, 1967. 

The election is, to date, the last time that a candidate for Governor of Texas won more than 70% of the vote, as well as the last in which a candidate won every county.

Primaries

Republican

Democratic

Results

References

1966
Texas
November 1966 events in the United States
1966 Texas elections